Carsten Christensen (born 28 August 1986) is a retired Danish goalkeeper. 

Christensen has represented SønderjyskE and FC Fredericia. AaB was his last club.

Career
He made his debut for AaB against OB in a 2-1 win.

Honours

Club
AaB
Danish Superliga (1): 2013–14
Danish Cup (1): 2013–14

References

1986 births
Living people
Association football goalkeepers
AaB Fodbold players
Danish Superliga players
Danish men's footballers
FC Fredericia players